Alain Defossé (11 February 1957 – 14 May 2017) was a French novelist and translator.

Early life
Alain Defossé was born on 11 February 1957 in Nantes. He studied at the Cours Florent.

Career
Defossé authored nine novels. His first novel,  Les fourmis d'Anvers, was published in 1991. He also translated several books from English into French. For example, he translated Crazy Cock by Henry Miller in 1990. He also translated American Psycho by Bret Easton Ellis in 1993. In 2006, he translated The Night Watch by Sarah Waters. Two years later, in 2008, he translated Rant by Chuck Palahniuk. Other novelists whose work he translated are Irvine Welsh and Joseph Connolly.

Death
Defossé died on 14 May 2017 in Paris.

Works

Novels

References

1957 births
2017 deaths
Writers from Nantes
Writers from Paris
French male novelists
20th-century French novelists
21st-century French novelists
20th-century French translators
21st-century translators
English–French translators
20th-century French male writers
21st-century French male writers
French male non-fiction writers